The Rt Rev. James Hannigan (15 July 1928 – 7 March 1994) was an Irish-born prelate of the Roman Catholic Church. He served firstly as the Bishop of Menevia (1983–1987), then the Bishop of Wrexham (1987–1994).

Born in Cloghan in County Donegal on 15 July 1928, trained for the priesthood at the seminary of St Sulpice in Paris, and he was ordained to the priesthood on 27 June 1954. He was appointed the Bishop of the Diocese of Menevia by the Holy See on 13 October 1983. His consecration to the Episcopate took place on 23 November 1983, with the principal consecrator being The Most Rev. John Ward, Archbishop of Cardiff, and the principal co-consecrators were The Rt Rev. Daniel Mullins, Auxiliary Bishop of Cardiff (later Bishop of Menevia), and The Most Rev. Séamus Hegarty, Bishop of Raphoe (later Bishop of Derry). Hannigan became the first Bishop of Wrexham on 12 February 1987.

Bishop Hannigan died in office at the Countess of Chester Hospital, Chester, England, on 7 March 1994, aged 65, and was buried in Wrexham Cemetery in Ruabon Road, Wrexham.

References

1928 births
1994 deaths
20th-century Roman Catholic bishops in Wales
Irish emigrants to the United Kingdom
People from County Donegal
Roman Catholic bishops of Menevia
Irish expatriate Catholic bishops
Roman Catholic bishops of Wrexham